The UCI Track Cycling World Championships – Men's scratch is the world championship scratch race held annually at the UCI Track Cycling World Championships. It was first held at the 2002 championships in Ballerup, near Copenhagen, Denmark. , the event has had two two-time winners, Franco Marvulli of Switzerland in 2002 and 2003 and Alex Rasmussen of Denmark in 2004 and 2010.

Medalists

Medal table

External links
Track Cycling World Championships 2016–1893 bikecult.com
World Championship, Track, Scratch, Elite cyclingarchives.com

 
Men's scratch
Lists of UCI Track Cycling World Championships medalists